The Oakland Slammers, based in Oakland, California were members of the International Basketball League (2005-) for two seasons, and completed their second season in the league in 2006.

In its first year, the Slammers finished 5–14, good for seventh in the west, and was led by Solomon Wilkins 25.9 ppg, Delonte Hoskins 17.9 ppg, Carey Williams 17.5 ppg, Larry Morinia 16.2 ppg and Jairus Michael 11.6 ppg.

The Slammers played their home games at Merritt College in Oakland.

Related Links/Sources
 - Team page on IBL Website

International Basketball League teams
Sports teams in Oakland, California
Basketball teams in the San Francisco Bay Area
2005 establishments in California
2006 disestablishments in California
Basketball teams established in 2005
Basketball teams disestablished in 2006